Natsuko (ナツコ) is the fourth and final studio album by Carlos Toshiki & Omega Tribe released on July 27, 1990 by Warner Pioneer. The album peaked at No. 13 on the Oricon charts.

The album is the first and only album to be released by Warner Pioneer, transferring from VAP for unknown reasons. Yasushi Akimoto and Yasuhiro Konishi would return as lyricists, with the art being illustrated by Mineko Ueda. The band would then break up the next year after a final tour.

Track listing

Charts

References 

1990 albums
Omega Tribe (Japanese band) albums